George Augustus Selwyn (11 August 1719 – 25 January 1791) of Matson House in Gloucestershire, England, was a Member of Parliament. A renowned eccentric and "necrophiliac, gay transvestite, he sat mute, loved, and undisturbed in the House of Commons for 44 years".

Origins
He was the eldest surviving son of John Selwyn (1688–1751), MP, of Matson, by his wife Mary Farrington, a daughter of General Thomas Farrington. He was educated at Eton College and  Hart Hall, Oxford (1739) and studied law at the Inner Temple (1737).

Political career
Selwyn spent 44 years in the House of Commons without having made a speech. As the patron of several rotten boroughs, including both seats at Ludgershall and one in Gloucester, he put his electoral interests at the disposal of the King's ministers, and received in return three lucrative sinecure offices and a pension, which offset his gambling debts. He himself served as one of the MPs for Ludgershall in 1747–1754 and for the constituency of Gloucester from 1754 to 1780. After he lost his patronage in Gloucester, Selwyn served again as a Member for Ludgershall from 1780 until his death in 1791.  He served as Mayor of Gloucester twice, for 1758 and 1765.

He was also elected for the Scottish constituency of Wigtown Burghs in 1768, when he thought he might be defeated at Gloucester, becoming the first Englishman to be elected to Parliament by a constituency in Scotland. He chose to retain the English seat.

Personal life
He was a homosexual and was attracted to various forms of sexual eccentricity, including necrophilia and tranvestitism. He was known for his fascination with the macabre, and was a keen observer of public executions. When attempting to visit the dying Henry Fox, the latter  quipped "If Mr. Selwyn calls again, show him up; if I am alive I shall be glad to see him and if I am dead I am sure he will be delighted to see me". He was a member of the Hellfire Club and was a friend of Horace Walpole.

Adopted daughter
He adopted as his daughter Maria Emilia Fagnani, who married Francis Seymour-Conway, 3rd Marquess of Hertford. She was reputedly the illegitimate daughter of William Douglas, 4th Duke of Queensberry, by his mistress Costanza Brusati ("the Marchesa Fagnani"), the wife of Giacomo II Fagnani, IV marchese di Gerenzano (1740-1785), an Italian nobleman descended from the jurist Raffaele Fagnani (1552-1623), a resident of the Duchy of Milan. He constructed for her use a Roman Catholic chapel in the attic of Matson House, which survives.  Maria became one of the wealthiest heiresses in Britain, having inherited a large part of the estate of her natural father the Duke of Queensberry, the eighth richest man in Britain.

Death and burial
He died unmarried in 1791 and was buried in the Selwyn vault at St. Katherine's Church at Matson on 6 February 1791. The vault has since been filled in and the brass plate from his coffin is now affixed on a wall inside the church. He left his estate to his adopted daughter Maria Fagnani, Marchioness of Hertford.

Portraits 
 George Augustus Selwyn and Frederick Howard, 5th Earl of Carlisle (c.1770) by Sir Joshua Reynolds is in the possession of the present Earl of Carlisle at Castle Howard, Yorkshire.
 George Augustus Selwyn at the age of fifty-one by Hugh Douglas Hamilton, a pastelle drawn in 1770. This drawing is also in the possession of the Earl of Carlisle at Castle Howard.
 George Augustus Selwyn (1776) by Sir Joshua Reynolds was displayed at the Tate Gallery between 26 May and 18 September 2005 in the exhibition Joshua Reynolds: The Creation of Celebrity

Further reading
History of Parliament: House of Commons 1754–1790, by Sir Lewis Namier and James Brooke (Sidgwick & Jackson, 1964)
 Jesse, John Heneage, George Selwyn and his contemporaries, London : Bickers & Son, 1882, 2nd ed.; 1st edition, 1843–1844
 George Selwyn; his letters and his life, edited by E.S. Roscoe and Helen Clergue, London, 1899.
 Sherwin, Oscar, A gentleman of wit and fashion: the extraordinary life and times of George Selwyn, New York : Twayne Publishers, (1963).
 George Augustus Selwyn (1719–1791) and France : unpublished correspondence, edited by Rex A. Barrell, Lewiston, N.Y., USA : E. Mellen Press, (c. 1990).
 The Ghosts of Piccadilly, Chapters IV & XIV, by G. S. Street, London: Constable & Company Ltd.
 The Age of Scandal, Chapter named The Necrophilist  by T.H. White

References

External links 

 
 

George Selwyn: His Letters and His Life, E. S. Roscoe and Helen Clergue eds., London, 1899
George Selwyn and the Wits, S. Parnell Kerr, London, 1909

1719 births
1791 deaths
People educated at Eton College
Alumni of Hart Hall, Oxford
Members of the Inner Temple
Members of the Parliament of Great Britain for English constituencies
Members of Parliament for Gloucester
British MPs 1747–1754
British MPs 1754–1761
British MPs 1761–1768
British MPs 1768–1774
British MPs 1774–1780
British MPs 1780–1784
British MPs 1784–1790
British MPs 1790–1796
Mayors of Gloucester